Sverre Brodahl (26 January 1909 – 2 November 1998) was a Norwegian Nordic skier who competed in the 1930s. He won two medals at the 1936 Winter Olympics in Garmisch-Partenkirchen with a silver in the 4 × 10 km, and a bronze in the Nordic combined.

In addition, he won the Holmenkollen ski festival's Nordic combined event in 1937.

Cross-country skiing results
All results are sourced from the International Ski Federation (FIS).

Olympic Games
 1 medal – (1 silver)

World Championships

References

External links
 Holmenkollen Winners since 1892
 
 
 

1909 births
1998 deaths
Norwegian male Nordic combined skiers
Cross-country skiers at the 1936 Winter Olympics
Nordic combined skiers at the 1936 Winter Olympics
Olympic Nordic combined skiers of Norway
Olympic medalists in cross-country skiing
Olympic medalists in Nordic combined
Norwegian male cross-country skiers
FIS Nordic World Ski Championships medalists in cross-country skiing
Norwegian resistance members
Medalists at the 1936 Winter Olympics
Olympic silver medalists for Norway
Olympic bronze medalists for Norway
20th-century Norwegian people